Pseuderemias striatus, Peters's sand lizard or  Peters's sand racer, is a species of lizard found in Kenya, Somalia, and Ethiopia.

References

Pseuderemias
Lacertid lizards of Africa
Reptiles of Ethiopia
Reptiles of Kenya
Reptiles of Somalia
Reptiles described in 1874
Taxa named by Wilhelm Peters